The Coalition (formerly Zipline Studios, Microsoft Game Studios Vancouver and Black Tusk Studios) is a Canadian video game developer and a studio of Xbox Game Studios based in Vancouver. The Coalition is best known for developing games in the Gears of War series after the franchise's acquisition by Xbox Game Studios from Epic Games.

History 
The studio was formed in February 2010 as Zipline Studios, and under that name developed the Facebook game Relic Rescue. In May 2011, the studio was renamed Microsoft Game Studios Vancouver as it shifted its focus away from social games, instead working on Microsoft Flight and Kinect shooter game Project Columbia. On July 25, 2012, Project Columbia and further development on Microsoft Flight were cancelled, with all 35 employees being laid off. On November 29, 2012, the studio was renamed Black Tusk Studios, and tasked with creating a new major franchise for Microsoft Studios to rival their popular Halo franchise.

On January 27, 2014, it was announced that Microsoft had acquired the Gears of War franchise from Epic Games, and that Black Tusk Studios would take on the development of future games in the series. As part of the Gears of War acquisition, Microsoft also hired Rod Fergusson, who was the executive producer on the first three Gears of War games, to oversee development. On June 3, 2015, Fergusson announced that Black Tusk Studios had been renamed The Coalition; similarly to Microsoft's Halo studio 343 Industries, the studio's name references an entity within the Gears of War franchise—the Coalition of Ordered Governments.

Fergusson announced his departure as studio head in February 2020 to move over to Blizzard Entertainment to oversee the Diablo series.

Games developed

Cancelled 
 Project Columbia (2012)

References

External links 

 

2010 establishments in British Columbia
Canadian companies established in 2010
Companies based in Vancouver
First-party video game developers
Microsoft subsidiaries
Video game companies established in 2010
Video game companies of Canada
Video game development companies
Xbox Game Studios